Lawrence Chungu (born 11 November 1991) is a Zambian footballer who plays as a defender for Zanaco F.C. and the Zambia national football team.

References

External links

1991 births
Living people
Kabwe Warriors F.C. players
Power Dynamos F.C. players
Zanaco F.C. players
Zambian footballers
Zambia international footballers
Association football defenders
People from Chingola
Buildcon F.C. players
Zambia A' international footballers
2018 African Nations Championship players